The National is a weekday English language newspaper published in Papua New Guinea. It is also published online. The paper is owned by Malaysian logging company Rimbunan Hijau.

See also 
 List of newspapers in Papua New Guinea

References

External links
The National’s website

Companies of Papua New Guinea
Newspapers published in Papua New Guinea
Publications with year of establishment missing